Karl Traub was a German politician for the Christian Democratic Union of Germany (CDU) From 1996 to 2016, he was a member of the Landtag of Baden-Württemberg, the state parliament of Baden-Württemberg.

Biography 

Traub was born in 1941 in the village of Hausen am Bussen and was trained as a farmer.

From 1996 to 2016 Traub was a member of the Landtag of Baden-Württemberg. He also served as the mayor of his home town from 1966 to 2009.

References 

1942 births
2021 deaths
Members of the Landtag of Baden-Württemberg
Politicians from Baden-Württemberg
Christian Democratic Union of Germany politicians
People from Alb-Donau-Kreis